Hurst is a hamlet in West Sussex, England. It lies on the Hampshire-Sussex border on the B2146 road. Its nearest town is Petersfield, approximately 2 miles (3.2 km) north-west.

Villages in West Sussex